Wat Mangkon Kamalawat, previously (and still commonly) known as Wat Leng Noei Yi, is the largest and most important Chinese Buddhist temple in Bangkok, Thailand. It hosts celebrations of a number of year-round events, including Chinese New Year, and the annual Chinese vegetarian festival.

It is located in the district of Pom Prap Sattru Phai in the city's Chinatown, in a courtyard off Charoen Krung Road, accessed by an alleyway. It is served by Wat Mangkon MRT station located in front of the temple.

History

Wat Mangkon Kamalawat was founded as a Mahayana Buddhist temple in 1871 or 1872 (sources differ), by Phra Archan Chin Wang Samathiwat (also known as Sok Heng), initially with the name Wat Leng Noei Yi. It was later given its current name, Wat Mangkon Kamalawat, meaning "Dragon Lotus Temple", by King Chulalongkorn (Rama V).

Style and Layout

The temple is built in a classic Chinese architectural style, with typical sweeping tiled roofs decorated with animal and floral motifs, including the ubiquitous Chinese dragons. The ubosot (ordination hall) houses the temple's main, gold colored, Buddha image in a fusion of Thai and Chinese style, and is fronted by an altar at which religious rites are performed.

The main entrance to the viharn (sermon hall) is flanked by large statues of the four guardians of the world, the Chatulokkaban, clothed in warrior costumes, two on each side. Around the temple there are shrines dedicated to a variety of Buddhist, Taoist and Confucian deities and religious figures, all important in local Chinese beliefs.

At the rear of the temple stand three pavilions, one dedicated to the Chinese goddess (or bodhisattva) of compassion, Guan Yin, one to the temple's founder, Phra Archan Chin Wang Samathiwat, and one to the saint Lak Chao. Near the rear is also to be found a gallery containing cases of gilded Buddha images in the double Abhaya Mudra position.

The courtyard in front of the main temple buildings is home to several other shrines, including a furnace for the ritual burning of paper money and other offerings to the devotees' ancestors.

See also
List of Buddhist temples in Thailand
Wat Bamphen Chin Phrot
Wat Dibayavari Vihara
Thian Fah Foundation

References

Mangkon Kamalawat
Pom Prap Sattru Phai district
Chinese-Thai Buddhist temples
Unregistered ancient monuments in Bangkok
Chinese architecture in Thailand